The Mixed Doubles tournament of the 2018 European Junior Badminton Championships was held from September 11-16. Russian pair Rodion Alimov and Alina Davletova clinched this title in the last edition. Ian Spiller / Petra Polanc from Slovenia leads the seedings this year.

Seeded

  Ian Spiller / Petra Polanc (third round)
  Iliyan Stoynov / Hristomira Popovska (fourth round)
  Sebastian Gronbjerg / Amalie Magelund (third round)
  Gijs Duijs / Madouc Linders (second round)
  Ethan Van Leeuwen / Sian Kelly (quarter-finals)
  Georgii Karpov / Anastasiia Kurdyukova (fourth round)
  Lukas Resch / Emma Moszczynski (semi-finals)
  Ties van der Lecq / Milou Lugters (second round)
  Melker Z-Bexell / Tilda Sjoo (fourth round)
  William Villeger / Ainoa Desmons (third round)
  Rory Easton / Hope Warner (quarter-finals)
  Jona van Nieuwkerke / Joke de Langhe (withdrew)
  Fabien Delrue / Juliette Moinard (champions)
  Egor Kholkin / Anastasiia Pustinskaia (fourth round)
  Daniel Popescu / Loredana Lungu (third round)
  Danylo Bosniuk / Valyeriya Masaylo (third round)

Draw

Finals

Top Half

Section 1

Section 2

Section 3

Section 4

Bottom Half

Section 5

Section 6

Section 7

Section 8

References

External links 
Main Draw

European Junior Badminton Championships
European Junior